Charles George Reinier Corver (16 January 1936 – 10 November 2020) was a Dutch football referee.

Career
He was decorated twice by the Queen (Order of Orange-Nassau) and the football association (KNVB-UEFA-FIFA).

He refereed the 1982 World Cup semifinal between Germany and France in Seville, Spain, when he deemed goalkeeper Harald Schumacher's collision with Patrick Battiston to be not a foul.
Battiston remained unconscious for over a minute and sustained the loss of 3 teeth and a damaged vertebrae.

Corver was referee at two World Cups and two European championships. He refereed four European Cup finals, ten semifinals and a final World Cup for clubs in Argentina. More than 140 international matches and more than 600 national matches. After his last final (1983) in Portugal he was observer for UEFA-FIFA and KNVB for 22 years and member of the disciplinary committee for sixteen years. His profession was national sales manager at Heineken.

References

  

1936 births
2020 deaths
Dutch football referees
FIFA World Cup referees
Sportspeople from Leiden
People's Party for Freedom and Democracy politicians
1982 FIFA World Cup referees
1978 FIFA World Cup referees
UEFA Euro 1980 referees